USS LST-823 was an LST-542-class tank landing ship in the United States Navy. Like many of her class, she was not named and is properly referred to by her hull designation.

LST-823 was laid down on 25 September 1944 at Evansville, Indiana, by the Missouri Valley Bridge & Iron Co.; launched on 4 November 1944; sponsored by Miss Olinda M. Brune; and commissioned on 28 November 1944.

Service history
LST-823 was assigned to the Asiatic-Pacific theater. She arrived at Pearl Harbor in February 1945 and delivered Seabees and cargo to Guam in March. At the end of May she and another LST, one towing a landing craft and the other a repair barge, sailed from Guam for Okinawa. On 4 June the small convoy rode out a typhoon that drove it some eighty miles off course. LST-823 entered Okinawa's Buckner Bay in early July, but went to sea in mid-July to evade a typhoon. She called at Saipan in early August, delivered ammunition to Iwo Jima in mid-August, and returned to Buckner Bay in early September.

Typhoon
Caught off guard inside Buckner Bay by a typhoon on 16 September 1945, LST-823 was driven onto the Kutaka Shima reef there. She was pulled off a week later by the salvage ship , but both engines were inoperative and the starboard engine and shaft were badly out of alignment. Her entire bottom was badly damaged and holed and both main engines were badly misaligned. LST-823 patched up her leaks with cement and became a fueling and provisions ship for small craft. The ship was not refloated, and in early November an inspection and survey party noted that she would need two weeks in drydock before she could be towed to a rear area and recommended she be decommissioned in place. Her gear was stripped away and taken to Guam, and she was decommissioned at the beginning of December 1945 and stricken from the Navy List in early January 1946. In May 1947, the hulk was sold to the Oklahoma-Philippines Co.

LST-823 earned one battle star for World War II service.

References

 Naval Historical Center

 

LST-542-class tank landing ships
World War II amphibious warfare vessels of the United States
Ships built in Evansville, Indiana
1944 ships
Maritime incidents in September 1945